Kirkburn House is a Category B listed building on South Road in Peterhead, Aberdeenshire, Scotland. It was the manse for the adjacent, now-ruined Old St Peter's Church. Its name refers to the now-culverted burn in the hollow alongside the building.

See also
List of listed buildings in Peterhead, Aberdeenshire

References

External links
 KIRKBURN HOUSE (FORMER MANSE) AND OFFICES - Historic Environment Scotland

Listed buildings in Peterhead
Category B listed buildings in Aberdeenshire
1845 establishments in Scotland
Residential buildings completed in 1845
Tudor architecture
Clergy houses in Scotland